Ryan Calo is an American legal scholar, internationally recognized within the fields of emerging technology, especially privacy, robotics, and artificial intelligence. He is a co-founder of the University of Washington Tech Policy Lab and the Center for an Informed Public which focuses on combating misinformation.

Education and career
Calo studied philosophy at Dartmouth College, then moved into a role investigating allegations of police misconduct in New York City. After graduating from law school at University of Michigan, he worked for R. Guy Cole Jr., and on privacy and administrative law in the D.C. office of Covington and Burling, LLC.

At Stanford Law School, he directed privacy and robotics research at the Stanford Center for Internet and Society, and founded the Legal Aspects of Autonomous Driving initiative.

He eventually advanced to faculty member at the University of Washington, where he holds multiple positions. He holds the Lane Powell and D. Wayne Gittinger Endowed Professorship at the School of Law; a Professor at the Information School; and an Adjunct Professor at the Paul G. Allen School of Computer Science and Engineering. His work in robotics and cyberlaw was the focus of an article in Science magazine that highlighted the research behind his paper "Robots and the Lessons of Cyberlaw" as well as a report he created for the Brookings Institution.

He is a founding co-director of the Tech Policy Lab, a unique, interdisciplinary collaboration at the University of Washington; and is co-founder of the Center for an Informed Public, a collaborative whose mission is to resist strategic misinformation, promote an informed society, and strengthen democratic discourse.

Calo chaired a University-wide task force on technology and society from fall 2021 to June 2022, and served as chair for the We Robot Conference 2022 when it was hosted by the University of Washington.

Calo was appointed at the World Bank to review privacy appeals and has testified before the United States Senate three times.

Filmography
Calo has served as a consulting expert on multiple television series and films. 
"Bill Nye Saves the World: Machines Take Over the World": Calo was a panelist for the episode's discussion on the potential and pitfalls of artificial intelligence.
"Terms and Conditions May Apply": Calo lent his expertise as Director of Privacy and Robotics, Stanford Center for Internet & Society to this documentary
"Revolution with Brian Solis": Calo starred in Season 1, Episode 12 of this series that "connects you to the people, trends, and ideas defining the future of business, marketing, and media."

Publications

"Artificial Intelligence and the Carousel of Soft Law," IEEE Transactions on Technology and Society (2021)
"The Automated Administrative State: A Crisis of Legitimacy," Emory Law Journal (2021)

References 

Year of birth missing (living people)
Living people
American legal scholars
Stanford Law School faculty
University of Michigan Law School alumni
University of Washington School of Law faculty
Dartmouth College alumni